Ashwell is a rural locality in the City of Ipswich, Queensland, Australia.

Geography 
Kunkala is a neighbourhood in the north of the locality near the Kunkala railway station on the now-closed Marburg branch railway line.

History
The origin of the name Ashwell is from a town in the United Kingdom by the name of Ashwell. Walter Loveday and Henry Stevens provided an acre each of land for a school in this district to be named Ashwell after Walter Loveday's farm titled Ashwell which he named after Ashwell, United Kingdom.

Ashwell State School opened on 8 November 1887.

The name Kunkala may be an Aboriginal word for  running fresh water.

At the  Ashwell and nearby Lanefield recorded a population of 234.

Education 
Ashwell State School is a government primary (Prep-6) school for boys and girls at 35 Reinke Road. In 2018, the school had an enrolment of 58 students with 4 teachers and 8 non-teaching staff (4 full-time equivalent).

There is no secondary school in Ashwell. The nearest secondary school is Rosewood State High School in neighbouring Rosewood to the south-east.

References

City of Ipswich
Localities in Queensland